The 646th Aircraft Control and Warning Squadron was the operational USAF unit of Highlands Air Force Station. The unit operated the Texas Tower 4, an offshore radar annex from 1958 until it collapsed into the Atlantic Ocean on 15 January 1961, killing 28 people.  The squadron was activated on 1 June 1948, and renamed to the 646th Radar Squadron (SAGE) on 1 October 1958.

References

Aerospace Defense Command units
1948 in military history
Military units and formations of the United States in the Cold War
Military units and formations established in 1948
1948 establishments in New Jersey
1966 disestablishments in New Jersey